Sammy Lane Resort Historic District was a national historic district located at Branson, Taney County, Missouri.  The district encompassed four contributing buildings and two contributing structures built between 1925 and 1943 as part of a resort.  They were four log and native rock resort cottages, an elaborate native rock landscape construction and a well house.  The buildings and structures were excellent vernacular examples expressive of the Bungalow / American Craftsman aesthetic.  The resort has been demolished and replaced with The Branson Landing.

It was listed on the National Register of Historic Places in 1993 and delisted in 2003.

References

Former National Register of Historic Places in Missouri
Historic districts on the National Register of Historic Places in Missouri
Bungalow architecture in Missouri
Buildings and structures in Taney County, Missouri
National Register of Historic Places in Taney County, Missouri